Irkutsk is the largest city and administrative center of Irkutsk Oblast, Russia.

Irkutsk may also refer to:
 Irkutsk Oblast, a federal subject of Russia
 Irkutsk Airport, an airport in Irkutsk, Russia
 Irkutsk Energy, a hydroelectric company in Russia
 Irkutsk Northwest Airport, is a civilian airport located near Irkutsk Russia
 Irkutsk railway station, a station along the Trans-Siberian Railway